The 2021–22 Tarleton State Texans men's basketball team represented Tarleton State University in the 2021–22 NCAA Division I men's basketball season. The Texans, led by second-year head coach Billy Gillispie, played their home games at the Wisdom Gym in Stephenville, Texas, as members of the Western Athletic Conference.

The season marked Tarleton State's second year of a four-year transition period from Division II to Division I. As a result, the Texans were not eligible to play in the NCAA tournament or the WAC tournament. However, they were eligible to play in the CIT or CBI.

Previous season 
In a season limited due to the ongoing COVID-19 pandemic, the Texans finished the 2020–21 season 10–10, 5–7 in WAC play to finish in sixth place. They were not eligible for the WAC tournament.

Roster

Schedule and results

|-
!colspan=12 style=| Exhibition

|-
!colspan=12 style=| Non-conference regular season

|-
!colspan=12 style=| WAC conference season

|-

Source

See also 
2021–22 Tarleton State Texans women's basketball team

References

Tarleton State Texans men's basketball seasons
Tarleton State
Tarleton State Texans men's basketball
Tarleton State Texans men's basketball